John C. Wagner (March 27, 1858 – October 11, 1937) was an American businessman and politician.

Wagner was born in Racine, Wisconsin and went to the Racine public schools. He was involved with the weaving industry and then was involved with the hotel business in Racine. He was also involved with the catering and restaurant business. Wagner served on the Racine Common Council and the Racine Board of Supervisors. He also served as sheriff of Racine County and was a Republican. Wagner served in the Wisconsin Assembly in 1899 and 1900. Wagner died in Racine, Wisconsin after a long illness.

Notes

External links

1858 births
1937 deaths
Businesspeople from Racine, Wisconsin
Politicians from Racine, Wisconsin
Wisconsin sheriffs
County supervisors in Wisconsin
Wisconsin city council members
Republican Party members of the Wisconsin State Assembly